Inkerman can refer to:

Places
 Inkerman, a town in Crimea and the site of the Battle of Inkerman
 Inkerman, County Durham, a village in County Durham, in England
 Inkerman, Pennsylvania, a village in the United States
 Inkerman, Queensland, a town in Australia
 Inkerman, Renfrewshire, a mining hamlet in Scotland
 Inkerman, South Australia, a town in the Mid North of South Australia
 Inkerman Parish, New Brunswick, a community in Canada
 Inkerman, New Brunswick, a community located within Inkerman Parish
 Inkerman, Ontario, a community located within North Dundas township
 Inkerman Senate division, one of the constitutionally-mandated Canadian Senate divisions in Quebec

Events
 the Battle of Inkerman in the Crimean War

Other
 Inkerman Sugar Mill in Queensland, Australia
 Inkerman (ship, 1918), a French minesweeper, built at Canadian Car and Foundry, in Thunder Bay, lost on her maiden voyage
 Inkerman (horse)